Gustavo Viera may refer to:

 Gustavo Viera (Paraguayan footballer) (born 1995), Paraguayan football midfielder
 Gustavo Viera (Uruguayan footballer) (born 2000), Uruguayan football forward